Waropen Regency is one of the regencies (kabupaten) in Papua Province, Indonesia. The Regency covers an area of 10,847.97 km2, and it had a population of 24,639 at the 2010 Census and 33,943 at the 2020 Census. The official estimate as at mid 2021 was 34,414.

Originally, this area comprised those districts of the former Yapen Waropen Regency which lay on the Papuan mainland, but that regency was split in two on 12 November 2002, to form the Waropen Regency on the Papuan mainland and the Yapen Islands Regency consisting of Yapen Island and some smaller islands in Cenderawasih Bay.

The languages ​​of the East Geelvink Bay family that is Waropen language are spoken in the regency. While the main ethnic groups that inhabit this regency are the Waropen people, and the Biak who generally inhabit coastal areas.

Administrative Districts
At the 2010 Census, Waropen Regency comprised ten districts (distrik), but subsequently two additional districts have been created - Soyoi Mambai and Wonti. The twelve districts are tabulated below with their areas and their populations at the 2010 Census and as officially estimated in mid 2021. The table also includes the location of the district administrative centres.

Note: (a) the 2010 populations of Soyoi Mambai and Wonti Districts are included with the population of the districts (Risei Sayati and Demba) from which they were subsequently cut out.

Climate
Botawa, the seat of the regency has a tropical rainforest climate (Af) with heavy to very heavy rainfall year-round.

References

External links
Statistics publications from Statistics Indonesia (BPS)

Regencies of Papua (province)